The 1972 Harvard Crimson football team was an American football team that represented Harvard University during the 1972 NCAA University Division football season. Harvard finished fifth in the Ivy League.

In their second year under head coach Joe Restic, the Crimson compiled a 4–4–1 record and outscored opponents 198 to 186. Theodore DeMars was the team captain.

Harvard's 3–3–1  conference record placed fifth in the Ivy League standings. The Crimson outscored Ivy opponents 146 to 144. 

Harvard played its home games at Harvard Stadium in the Allston neighborhood of Boston, Massachusetts.

Schedule

References

Harvard
Harvard Crimson football seasons
Harvard Crimson football
Harvard Crimson football